Plymstock railway station served the suburb of Plymstock, Plymouth, England from 1892 to 1961 on the Plymouth to Yealmpton Branch.

History 
The station opened on 5 September 1892 by the London and South Western Railway. It originally opened on 1 July 1892 but it didn't serve passengers. The signal box was moved onto the platform in 1935. It was later destroyed along with the ticket office by a bomb in March 1941 during the Second World War. They were rebuilt quickly. The station closed on 15 January 1951 but reopened on 2 July 1951, only to close again to passengers on 10 September 1951. It closed to goods traffic on 30 September 1961. The signal box closed in 1963

References

External links 

Disused railway stations in Devon
Former London and South Western Railway stations
Railway stations opened in 1892
Railway stations closed in 1951
1892 establishments in England
1961 disestablishments in England
Railway stations in Great Britain opened in the 19th century